Pablo Burchard (November 4, 1875 – July 13, 1964) was a Chilean painter. His father was German architect Teodoro Burchard Haeberle, who arrived in Chile around 1855, and introduced the Gothic style, and his mother was María (Sofía) Luisa Eggeling Metzger. He taught in the University of Chile's School of Fine Arts from 1932 to 1959, and he won the National Prize of Art of Chile in 1944.

References

External links

1875 births
1964 deaths
Chilean people of German descent
People from Santiago
Chilean male painters
20th-century Chilean painters
Chilean male artists
Male painters
20th-century Chilean male artists